Midnight Sun Peak  is a mountain in the Baffin Mountains, Baffin Island, Nunavut, Canada.

Geography
Midnight Sun Peak is a flat-topped mountain. It is located in the eastern Baffin Mountains which in turn form part of the Arctic Cordillera mountain system.

References

External links
 SummitPost - Midnight Sun Peak

Arctic Cordillera
One-thousanders of Nunavut